Elections to Down District Council were held on 17 May 1989 on the same day as the other Northern Irish local government elections. The election used four district electoral areas to elect a total of 23 councillors.

Election results

Note: "Votes" are the first preference votes.

Districts summary

|- class="unsortable" align="centre"
!rowspan=2 align="left"|Ward
! % 
!Cllrs
! % 
!Cllrs
! %
!Cllrs
! %
!Cllrs
! %
!Cllrs
!rowspan=2|TotalCllrs
|- class="unsortable" align="center"
!colspan=2 bgcolor="" | SDLP
!colspan=2 bgcolor="" | UUP
!colspan=2 bgcolor="" | DUP
!colspan=2 bgcolor="" | Alliance
!colspan=2 bgcolor="white"| Others
|-
|align="left"|Ballynahinch
|bgcolor="#99FF66"|45.3
|bgcolor="#99FF66"|2
|36.1
|2
|13.8
|1
|0.0
|0
|4.8
|0
|5
|-
|align="left"|Downpatrick
|bgcolor="#99FF66"|65.1
|bgcolor="#99FF66"|5
|14.9
|1
|0.0
|0
|7.2
|1
|12.8
|0
|7
|-
|align="left"|Newcastle
|bgcolor="#99FF66"|54.2
|bgcolor="#99FF66"|4
|28.1
|2
|6.9
|0
|0.0
|0
|10.8
|0
|6
|-
|align="left"|Rowallane
|26.9
|1
|bgcolor="40BFF5"|50.7
|bgcolor="40BFF5"|3
|16.1
|1
|0.0
|0
|6.3
|0
|5
|- class="unsortable" class="sortbottom" style="background:#C9C9C9"
|align="left"| Total
|49.2
|12
|31.1
|8
|8.5
|2
|2.2
|1
|9.0
|0
|23
|-
|}

Districts results

Ballynahinch

1985: 2 x SDLP, 2 x UUP, 1 x DUP
1989: 2 x SDLP, 2 x UUP, 1 x DUP
1985-1989 Change: No change

Downpatrick

1985: 4 x SDLP, 1 x UUP, 1 x Sinn Féin, 1 x Workers' Party
1989: 5 x SDLP, 1 x UUP, 1 x Alliance
1985-1989 Change: SDLP and Alliance gain from Sinn Féin and Workers' Party

Newcastle

1985: 3 x SDLP, 1 x UUP, 1 x Sinn Féin, 1 x DUP
1989: 4 x SDLP, 2 x UUP
1985-1989 Change: SDLP and UUP gain from Sinn Féin and DUP

Rowallane

1985: 3 x UUP, 1 x DUP, 1 x SDLP
1989: 3 x UUP, 1 x DUP, 1 x SDLP
1985-1989 Change: No change

References

Down District Council elections
Down